Stornoway,  is a small village of 600 people. It is a municipality in Quebec, in the regional county municipality of Le Granit in the administrative region of Estrie. It is named after Stornoway, a burgh on the Isle of Lewis, in the Outer Hebrides of Scotland by Colin Noble in 1852, replacing Bruceville.

It is at the intersection of two provincial highways, Route 108 and Route 161.

Demographics

External links 

Former official website of Stornoway:  
Legendre Mill 
Région du Lac-Mégantic 
Mégantic Region 
Stornoway 
Toponymy Commission of Quebec 
Affaires municipales et régions - cartes régionales

References 

Municipalities in Quebec
Incorporated places in Estrie
Le Granit Regional County Municipality